The 1927–28 Army Cadets men's ice hockey season was the 25th season of play for the program. The team was coached by Ray Marchand in his 5th season.

Season
With all three defensive starters having graduated, coach Marchand moved McNamara back to the blueline to help out. He replaced on the forward line by Lindquist but that was the least of Army's worries. Once again, the team's chances were harmed by poor weather. While Stuart Rink was formed, the skating surface was just 10 feet wide at times and could barely be used for practice, let alone a game. Army had to travel south to use the rink at Bear Mountain for the opening match against Clarkson. In spite of the difficulties, the Cadets performed well and kept the game close, losing 0–1 with a strong game from Browning, who stopped 21 shots. When the weather didn't improve, there was little hope of getting their normal rink in any kind of usable condition. As a result, the team decided to use Bear Mountain as their home venue for the year.

After a second shutout loss to Bates, Army got their first win in almost two years when they defeated Massachusetts Agricultural College. Even at their new digs, however, Army couldn't escape poor ice conditions and most of their games devolved into a slog. A lack of practice time finally caught up to the team at the end of the month when Boston University visited. Being unable to get much cohesion going between the players, Army was dominated 0–9.

It was almost two weeks before the Cadets played their next game but the time off didn't appear to help. Despite Dartmouth having a bit of a down year, they were nonetheless able to overwhelm Army 1–12 and began a stretch of subpar play for the Cadets. Army played four games over a two-week span and lost them all. While the scores were close in the first two matches, Royal Military College was again too powerful for the Cadets, who finished their season with a poor effort against Williams. Army was only able to muster 8 shots on net, 1 more than the Ephs' total number of goals.

With a second consecutive season apparently ruined by poor weather, an increasing level of pressure was being put on the administration for the team to have better facilities.

John Oakes served as the team's manager.

Roster

Standings

Schedule and Results

|-
!colspan=12 style=";" | Regular Season

References

Army Black Knights men's ice hockey seasons
Army
Army
Army
Army